Búlandstindur is a mountain in Eastern Iceland between the bays Berufjörður and Hamarsfjörður. It is a pyramid-shaped stack of basaltic strata.

Sources 

 The Berufjord bay (Land og saga)

Mountains of Iceland
One-thousanders of Iceland